Sebastián Ezequiel Soto (born 14 June 1991) is an Argentine professional footballer who plays as a midfielder for San Miguel.

Soto is due to join Defensores de Belgrano on 3 July 2019, having agreed a move on 30 May.

Career
Soto had youth spells with Chacarita Juniors, Justo José de Urquiza, Argentinos Juniors and Excursionistas. He made eight appearances for the latter in Primera C Metropolitana from 2009, which preceded a further eighty-eight arriving across the following three seasons. In 2013, Soto agreed to join Primera D Metropolitana's Deportivo Riestra. Fourteen goals came in forty-seven fixtures in his opening two campaigns as the club rose from tier five to Primera B Metropolitana for 2015. He netted against Platense, Deportivo Morón, Atlanta, Colegiales and Talleres across two years at that level. They won 2016–17 promotion to Primera B Nacional.

On 30 May 2019, after a season back in tier three with Deportivo Riestra, Soto agreed a move away for 2019–20 after penning terms with Defensores de Belgrano of Primera B Nacional.

Career statistics
.

References

External links

1991 births
Living people
People from Vicente López Partido
Argentine footballers
Association football midfielders
Primera C Metropolitana players
Primera D Metropolitana players
Primera B Metropolitana players
Primera Nacional players
Chacarita Juniors footballers
Asociación Social y Deportiva Justo José de Urquiza players
Argentinos Juniors footballers
CA Excursionistas players
Deportivo Riestra players
Defensores de Belgrano footballers
Club Atlético San Miguel footballers
Sportspeople from Buenos Aires Province